The 1953 World Archery Championships was the 16th edition of the event. It was held in Oslo, Norway on 21–25 July 1953 and was organised by World Archery Federation (FITA).

Medals summary

Recurve

Medals table

References

External links
 World Archery website
 Complete results

World Championship
World Archery
A
World Archery Championships
International sports competitions in Oslo
July 1953 sports events in Europe
1950s in Oslo